Lapley, Stretton and Wheaton Aston is a civil parish in the South Staffordshire district, in the county of Staffordshire, England. The population of the civil parish at the 2011 census was 2,548.

It contains, and is named for, the three villages of Lapley, Stretton and Wheaton Aston (which is by far the largest settlement). The area is rural, with the Shropshire Union Canal passing through, and the A5 road ("Watling Street") forms the parish's southern border.

History 
The parish was formed on 1 April 1986 as "Lapley and Stretton" from "Lapley" and "Stretton" and part of Penkridge. On 5 November 1990 it was renamed "Lapley, Stretton & Wheaton Aston".

See also
Listed buildings in Lapley, Stretton and Wheaton Aston

References

External links
 Lapley, Stretton and Wheaton Aston Parish Council website

Civil parishes in Staffordshire
South Staffordshire District